Poloma is a village and municipality in Sabinov District in the Prešov Region of north-eastern Slovakia.

History
In historical records the village was first mentioned in 1330.

Geography
The municipality lies at an altitude of 628 metres and covers an area of 5.911 km2. It has a population of about 965 people.

See also 
Gemerská Poloma, a town in Košice Region, Slovakia

External links
http://www.statistics.sk/mosmis/eng/run.html

Villages and municipalities in Sabinov District
Šariš